Joshua Antron Chapman (born June 10, 1989) is a former American football nose tackle. He attended the University of Alabama and was drafted in the 5th round of the 2012 NFL Draft by the Indianapolis Colts. Chapman served as the backup to All-American Terrence Cody during the 2008 and 2009 seasons, and was regarded as one of the better nose guard prospects in his class.

Chapman appeared on the cover of the October 10, 2011 issue of Sports Illustrated after Alabama's 38–10 victory over Florida.

High school career
A native of Birmingham, Alabama, Chapman attended Hoover High School and played high school football under head coach Rush Propst and defensive coordinator Jeremy Pruitt. Probst described him as the best defensive lineman in school history. As a junior, Chapman tallied 65 tackles, six sacks, and three tackles, while helping the Hoover Buccaneers to a 14–1 season record. In his senior season, Chapman recorded 97 tackles, 22 tackles for losses, two sacks, and an interception. Hoover finished the season as the 6A state runner-up with a 13–2 record, losing the state final 35–21 to Prattville. The only other loss came against Joe McKnight's John Curtis Christian (LA).

Regarded as a three-star prospect, Chapman was ranked as the No. 32 defensive tackle in his class, which was highlighted by Marvin Austin and Torrey Davis. He chose Alabama over offers from Auburn, Mississippi, and Mississippi State.

College career
Chapman attended and played college football at the University of Alabama from 2007–2011 under head coach Nick Saban. He played in three games in the 2007 season before earning a medical redshirt. He was part of the 2009 Alabama team that won the National Championship over the Texas Longhorns and the 2011 Alabama team that won the National Championship over the LSU Tigers.

Collegiate statistics

Professional career

2012 NFL Draft

Chapman was drafted in the fifth round (136th overall) by the Indianapolis Colts in the 2012 NFL Draft. He was the sixth of eight Crimson Tide players to be selected that year.

Indianapolis Colts
The Colts signed Chapman to a four-year, $2.3 million deal. He played 13 games in the 2013 season and made 20 tackles and defended one pass. In the 2014 season, he appeared in all 16 games and started 15. On the season, he had 25 total tackles and one forced fumble. On September 5, 2015, Chapman was waived by the Colts.

Post-playing career
After his time with the Colts, Chapman joined the Alabama coaching staff as an assistant strength coach.

References

External links
 
 
 Indianapolis Colts bio
 NFL Combine profile

1989 births
Living people
People from Hoover, Alabama
Players of American football from Alabama
African-American players of American football
American football defensive tackles
Alabama Crimson Tide football players
Indianapolis Colts players
21st-century African-American sportspeople
20th-century African-American people